Steven Hernandez (born March 2, 1997) is an American soccer player who last played for Orlando City B in USL League One.

References

External links 
 
 Steven Hernandez at AIC

1997 births
Living people
American soccer players
American International Yellow Jackets men's soccer players
Association football midfielders
Expatriate soccer players in the United States
Orlando City B players
People from Port Chester, New York
Reading United A.C. players
Soccer players from New York (state)
Sportspeople from Westchester County, New York
USL League One players
USL League Two players